Celso is a given name, a variant of Celsus. It may refer to:

People
 Celso Sozzini (1517–1570), Italian freethinker
 Celso Mancini (1542–1612), Italian Roman Catholic prelate
 Celso Zani (1580-unknown), Italian Roman Catholic prelate
 Celso Golmayo Zúpide (1820–1898), Spanish-Cuban chess player
 Celso Caesar Moreno (1830–1901), Italian adventurer and political figure
 Afonso Celso, Viscount of Ouro Preto (1836–1912), Brazilian politician and last Prime Minister of the Empire of Brazil
 Celso Ceretti (1844–1919), Italian anarchist and socialist politician
 Celso Benigno Luigi Costantini (1876–1958), Italian Roman Catholic cardinal
 Celso Lagar (1891–1966), Spanish painter
 Celso de Freitas (1912–1970), Guyanese cricketer
 Celso Emilio Ferreiro (1912–1979), Spanish Galicianist activist writer and politician
 Celso Peçanha (1916–2016), Brazilian politician, lawyer and journalist
 Celso Furtado (1920–2004), Brazilian economist
 Celso Brant (1920–2004), Brazilian politician
 Celso Battaia (1920–2007), Italian football midfielder
 Celso-Ramón García (1922–2014), Spanish-American physician
 Celso Garrido Lecca (born 1926), Peruvian composer
 Celso Pereira de Almeida (1928–2014), Brazilian Roman Catholic bishop
 Celso Posio (1931–2016), Italian football midfielder
 Celso Torrelio (1933–1999), Paraguayan military general and former President of Paraguay
 Celso Yegros Estigarribia (1935–2013), Paraguayan Roman Catholic bishop
 Zé Celso (born 1937), José Celso Martinez Corrêa, Brazilian actor, director and playwright
 Celso Murilo (born 1940), Brazilian musician, composer and arranger
 Celso Lafer (born 1941), Brazilian jurist, professor and politician
 Celso Amorim (born 1942), Brazilian diplomat
 Celso Ad. Castillo (1943–2012), Filipino director and screenwriter
 Celso Scarpini (born 1944), Brazilian basketball player
 Adu Celso (1945–2005), Brazilian motorcycle road racer
 Celso Pitta (born 1946–2009), Brazilian economist and politician
 Celso Grebogi (born 1947), Brazilian theoretical politician
 Celso Zubire (born 1947), Mexican artist
 Celso de Matos (born 1947), Portuguese football midfielder
 Celso Bugallo (born 1947), Spanish actor
 Celso Lobregat (born 1948), Filipino politician
 Celso Morga Iruzubieta (born 1948), Spanish Roman Catholic archbishop
 Celso Costa (born 1949), Brazilian mathematician
 Celso Valli (born 1950), Italian composer
 Celso Ferreira (born 1950), known as Celsinho, Brazilian football forward
 Celso Brandão (born 1951), Brazilian photographer and director
 Celso Daniel (1951–2002), Brazilian mayor
 Celso Dayrit (1951–2021), Filipino fencer and sports executive
 Celso Frateschi (born 1952), Brazilian actor, director, and politician
 Celso Marranzini (born 1952), Dominican economist and diplomat
 Celso Piña (1953–2019), Mexican singer, composer and accordionist
 Celso Machado (born 1953), Brazilian guitarist and multi-instrumentalist
 Claudio Celso (born 1955), Brazilian guitarist and composer
 Celso Fonseca (born 1956), Brazilian musician composer, guitarist and producer
 Celso Russomanno (born 1956), Brazilian reporter and politician
 Celso Blues Boy (1956–2012), Brazilian singer-songwriter and guitarist
 Celso Gavião (born 1956), Brazilian football centre-back goalkeeper
 Celso Roth (born 1957), Brazilian football manager and football midfielder
 Celso Giardini (born 1958), Italian sports shooter
 Celso Otero (born 1958), Uruguayan football manager and former 
 Celso Güity (1958–2021), Honduran football forward
 Celso Al. Carunungan (fl. 1959–1982), Filipino writer and screenwriter
 Celso Jaque (born 1960), Argentine politician
 Celso Luis Gomes (born 1964), Brazilian football defender
 Celso Portiolli (born 1967), Brazilian television presenter and broadcaster
 Celso Ayala (born 1970), Paraguayan football manager and former centre-back
 Celso Guerrero (born 1971), Paraguayan football manager and former goalkeeper
 Celso Riva (born 1974), Italian video game designer
 Celso Duarte (born 1974), Paraguayan harpist, singer and instrumentalist
 Celso Vieira (born 1974), Brazilian football midfielder
 Celso Albelo (born 1976), Spanish operatic tenor
 Celso Brum Junior (born 1978), Brazilian volleyball player
 Celso Cardoso De Moraes (born 1979), known as Chika, Brazilian football defender
 Celso Esquivel (born 1981), Paraguayan football right-back
 Celso Míguez (born 1982), Spanish racing driver
 Celso Vinicius (born 1983), Brazilian jiu-jitsu competitor and mixed martial artist
 Celso Capdevila (born 1984), Paraguayan football goalkeeper
 Celso Oliveira (born 1988), Brazilian canoeist
 Celso Borges (born 1988), Costa Rican football midfielder
 Celso Ortiz (born 1989), Paraguayan football midfielder
 Celso Raposo (born 1996), Portuguese football right-back
 El Celso (fl.2009-present), American post-graffiti artist
 Celso Arango (fl. 2011-present), Spanish psychiatrist

Places
 Celso Ramos, municipality in Santa Catarina, Brazil
 Santi Celso e Giuliano, basilica in Rome, Italy
 Santa Maria presso San Celso, church in Milan, Italy

See also
 Lo Celso, surname